MS ONe may refer to:

Lockout (film), also called MS One: Maximum Security
MySky MS One, an American light-sport aircraft design